Alvin "Buddy" Banks (January 15, 1927 – August 7, 2005) was a Canadian-born American jazz double-bassist.

Early life 
Born in St. Thomas, Ontario, Banks grew up in the United States and became interested in music during high school. He began as a pianist before switching to saxophone. During World War II, Banks joined the United States Army Band as a bass player.

Career 
Banks made his first appearance on record was in Vienna with Thurmond Young; this group also played live at the Colored Club. He played in Paris with Gerry Wiggins in 1950, and then with Bill Coleman in Berne, Switzerland, Belgium, and Le Havre, France. After problems with his passport in Switzerland, he left for Paris in 1953, where he recorded often with expatriate American jazz musicians as well as local performers. These include Hazel Scott, Buck Clayton, Lionel Hampton, Mezz Mezzrow, Don Byas, Albert Nicholas, and André Persiany. He toured with Michel Attenoux and with Sidney Bechet through Western and Central Europe in 1954.

References
Footnotes

General references
Howard Rye, "Buddy Banks (ii)". Grove Jazz.

1927 births
2005 deaths
People from St. Thomas, Ontario
Canadian jazz guitarists
Canadian male guitarists
Canadian jazz double-bassists
Male double-bassists
20th-century Canadian guitarists
20th-century double-bassists
20th-century Canadian male musicians
American male jazz musicians
American jazz guitarists
American male guitarists
American jazz double-bassists
20th-century American guitarists
20th-century American male musicians
Musicians from Ontario